This is a list of characters found in Batman Beyond, part of the DC Animated Universe (DCAU) continuity.

Batman Beyond

Main characters
 Terry McGinnis (voiced by Will Friedle) - The current Batman and a former juvenile delinquent. Under the pretense of doing errands for Bruce, Terry fights crime as the new Batman. Terry was chosen to be the new Dark Knight as he shared a similar loss as Bruce had....that being the death of a parent.

 Bruce Wayne (voiced by Kevin Conroy) - The original Batman, he is Terry's employer, mentor, and predecessor. During his final mission as Batman, Bruce suffered a heart attack that forced him to use a gun in self-defense. Abhorred by this, he hung up his cape and cowl. When Terry became the new Batman, Bruce monitors his activities from the Batcave.

 Maxine "Max" Gibson (voiced by Cree Summer) - A genius high schooler and friend of Terry's. She discovers his secret identity early on in the series, and from then on occasionally helps Batman in an Alfred-like role, though she is considered a nuisance to his predecessor (but less so as time went on). Her parents are divorced and she has an unnamed sister.

 Ace (vocal effects provided by Frank Welker) - Bruce Wayne's pet Great Dane, who was formerly a stray before being adopted by Bruce after he defended him from a Jokerz thug at Crime Alley during one of his annual visits there in memory of his slain parents. Fiercely loyal to Bruce, he eventually develops a bond with Terry as the series progresses.

Terry's family
 Warren McGinnis and Mary McGinnis (voiced by Michael Gross and Teri Garr) - Terry and Matt's divorced parents. Warren was killed by Mr. Fixx at the start of the series. How that happened is unknown, nor revealed to the public. Terry moves in with his mother after his father's death. Mary believes that Terry works as an errand boy for Bruce. In the rebooted universe, Mary was killed during the Futures End crossover.

 Matt McGinnis (voiced by Ryan O'Donohue) - Terry's younger brother. Always looking to get his brother in trouble, Matt is ironically a big fan of Batman. In the rebooted universe, Matt finds out about Terry's secret and becomes an invaluable ally to Batman, as well as the new Robin.

Recurring characters
 Dana Tan (voiced by Lauren Tom) - Terry's girlfriend. She had a hard time accepting his responsibilities as Bruce Wayne's employee initially, but became more understanding regarding his frequent absences. In both the original comics and the rebooted universe, she discovers Terry's secret. Later on, it is revealed during the Justice League Unlimited episode "Epilogue" that Terry was going to propose to her.

 Barbara Gordon (voiced by Stockard Channing in season 1, Angie Harmon in seasons 2 and 3 and Batman Beyond: Return of the Joker, Tara Strong as the young Barbara Gordon/Batgirl in Return of the Joker) - The no-nonsense Gotham police commissioner and former Batgirl. She was the daughter of the long-deceased former police commissioner, James Gordon. No longer what she once was, having been hardened and determined through years of personal tragedy, the new Commissioner Gordon is not entertained by the notion of Batman's heir and often clashes with Terry, though time helps her to realize his value to Neo-Gotham. Unlike most Batman universes, she never lost the use of her legs or became Oracle, although the event that in the comics led her to become the latter was referenced in the episode "A Touch of Curaré". It is also implied that she had an affair with Bruce that ended badly. Due to Barbara's father's past alliance with Batman, she is being suspected by the city (especially his rogues gallery) of maintaining the same relationship with him despite that she did not reinstall the Bat-Signal. In the rebooted comic universe, Barbara's not against working alongside Terry, she also encourages Dick Grayson's daughter Elainna to continue as the new Batwoman.

 Melanie Walker (voiced by Olivia d'Abo) - A member of the Royal Flush Gang by the name of Ten, she is an on-off love interest of Terry McGinnis, similar to Bruce Wayne and Selina Kyle, but without Melanie knowing that Terry is Batman.

 Sam Young (voiced by Paul Winfield) - A Gotham district attorney and Barbara's husband.

 Howard Groote (voiced by Max Brooks) - A nerdy student at Hamilton Hill High School and friend of Terry. His design was based on producer Paul Dini.

 Bobbi "Blade" Sommer (voiced by Melissa Disney) - A popular student at Terry's school. She never has a steady boyfriend and occasionally goes out with different boys. Blade is seen to be friends with Terry, Dana, Max and Howard.

 Chelsea Cunningham (voiced by Yvette Lowental in 1999 and 2000, Rachael Leigh Cook in 2000) - Another Hamilton High student, she is the best friend of Dana and Terry and the former girlfriend and crush of Nelson.

 Nelson Nash (voiced by Seth Green) - An athlete and bully at Terry's school, who eventually matures and becomes more friendly during the series. He seems to be popular with the girls, but never has a steady girlfriend. He is very similar, both physically and mentally, to Flash Thompson from the Spider-Man universe, given his adversarial-turned-friendly relationship with Terry and his admiration for Batman.

Supporting characters
 Justice League Unlimited - The series' incarnation of the Justice League.
 Superman (voiced by Christopher McDonald) - Kal-El, the Last Son of Krypton and an old ally and friend of Bruce during the latter's time as Batman and with whom he founded the original Justice League. The Man of Steel is still dedicating his life to fight for truth and justice, both in his superhero persona and as journalist Clark Kent. In the rebooted universe, Superman is Clark's adult son Jonathan.
 Aquagirl (voiced by Jodi Benson) - An Atlantean princess and daughter of the now-missing Aquaman.
 Big Barda (voiced by Farrah Forke) - A former member of the Female Furies of Apokolips.
 Green Lantern (voiced by Lauren Tom) - An Asian boy, Kai-Ro, is the latest to be chosen by the Green Lantern Corps to protect Space Sector 2814.
 Micron (voiced by Wayne Brady) - An African American superhero who carries the legacy of Professor Ray Palmer, otherwise known as the Atom. This enables him to grow and shrink in size.
 Warhawk (voiced by Peter Onorati) - Rex Stewart is the son of Green Lantern and Hawkgirl and successor of Hawkman.

 Infiltration Unit Zeta (voiced by Gary Cole in the first appearance, Diedrich Bader in later appearances) - An assassination android who unexpectedly develops a conscience, Zeta gave up his killing ways after he realizes how precious life is, and goes on the run as a fugitive from the government. Zeta became the protagonist of a spin-off series The Zeta Project.
 Rosalie "Ro" Rowan (voiced by Julie Nathanson) - A teenage runaway who joins Zeta in his quest for freedom.

Villains
  / Blight (voiced by Sherman Howard) - A ruthless businessman and father of Paxton Powers, whose company Powers Technology merged with Wayne Enterprises years before, around the time of Wayne's retirement as Batman. After accidentally being exposed to his own nerve gas, Powers is treated with radiation, which transforms him into the supervillain known as Blight, who has a translucent skeletal appearance and power over radiation. Powers' dual identity as Blight was later exposed by Paxton. While his body was never found when his submarine sank, suggesting that Blight might still be alive.
  (voiced by George Takei) - Derek Powers' right-hand man who is responsible for Warren McGinnis' death under his employer's orders. Having lost his right eye in the past, it implied by the shape of his scar that the original Batman was responsible with one of his batarangs. Fixx is presumably killed in a plane crash after a battle with the new Batman, drowning in Powers' weapon supplies in Gotham Bay.
 Dr. Stephanie Lake (voiced by Linda Hamilton) - A Wayne-Powers scientist. While being among the scientists who work to suppress Powers' radiation, Dr. Stephanie Lake suggested building him a new body. To test out this process, Dr. Lake convinced the head of Mr. Freeze to go through the cloning process while transferring his mind into the clone. While the process with Mr. Freeze worked at first with Victor Fries making different types of amends in his new body, Dr. Lake found that Victor's body was starting to revert to his subzero biology. Victor escaped after Dr. Lake locked him in a hot room under Powers' orders so that they can study the problem. When Victor obtained a new suit to keep his body cold, he resumed his Mr. Freeze identity and confronted Powers and Dr. Lake, which resulted in Mr. Freeze using his freeze gun to freeze Dr. Lake to death. Powers was also frozen, but was thawed out when he became Blight.
  (voiced by Cary Elwes in "Ascension", Parker Stevenson in "King's Ransom") - The estranged son of Derek Powers, who takes over his position as Wayne-Powers CEO after he secretly arranges the public exposure that reveals the elder Powers' identity as the supervillain Blight. However, Paxton is also as ruthless and power-hungry as his father's. Yet, unlike his father, Paxton neglects his duties as CEO and squanders the company's money for his leisures. Eventually, after numerous schemes opposed by Batman, Powers was arrested after his collusion with the Royal Flush Gang was exposed and Bruce Wayne re-assumed control of his company.

 The  - A violent street gang who dress and act in the tradition of the infamous Joker. Unlike the supervillain they emulate, they are merely teenage delinquents who enjoy vandalism and petty crime. However, most of the members truly are sociopathic, reminiscing about their idol, strongly implied that they use brainwashing as ritual of their initiation. They are usually apprehended by Batman quite easily and serve as more of a nuisance than a genuine threat. Despite this, they are a genuine problem for Neo-Gotham City, and their criminal activities and constant harassment of innocent citizens are one of the first signs that show how much worse things have gotten for the city after the original Batman's retirement. There have been three different versions of the Jokerz. In the mainstream comics, Dick Grayson (who was operating as Batman at the time) encountered a gang called the Jokerz which is led by a man impersonating the real Joker.
 J-Man's Jokerz Faction - The first faction of the Jokerz are first seen in the series premiere "Rebirth". They are seen committing petty pranks and harassment before being framed by Mr. Fixx for the murder of Terry's father. This branch of the Jokerz has appeared throughout the series since.
 J-Man (voiced by Bruce Timm) - Dresses very similarly to the original Joker. Bruce Timm is the producer for the DCAU shows, and joked in the DVD commentary that his performance as J-Man was "Emmy-Award-winning material".
 Dottie (voiced by Lauren Tom in the first appearance, Cree Summer in later appearances) - A member of the Jokerz who wears a polka-dot dress. She wields a rubber chicken with spikes on it.
 Smirk (voiced by Michael Rosenbaum) - J-Man's "right-hand clown".
 Coe (voiced by Scott Valentine) - A member of the Jokerz who wears a jester's hat and a jacket with one of the sleeves ripped off. He wields a baseball bat.
 Spike (voiced by Joe Lala in the first appearance, Mark Slaughter in later appearances) - A member of the Jokerz who wears a green trenchcoat and carries an acid-laced cream pie with him.
 Scab (voiced by Marc Worden) - A member of the Jokerz that wears a red single-coned jester's cap. Scab was possibly inspired by Harley Quinn. He is a power-hungry psychopath and wears a giant boxing glove on his right hand.
 Top Hat (voiced by Bruce Timm) - A member of the Jokerz that wears an outfit similar to the DCAU version of the Penguin.
 Lee (voiced by Ethan Embry) - A student at Hamilton Hill High School, he dropped out to join the Jokerz. When Scab and Coe stole an experimental aircraft during his initiation, he began to doubt his dream to be a member of the Jokerz. When the reactor became unstable, he knocked out Scab and shut down the reactor. Lee then left the Jokerz afterwards, choosing to lead a decent life.
 Terminal's Jokerz Faction - The second faction of the Jokerz was introduced in the episode "Hidden Agenda", shown committing more violent and arsonist acts than the first group. They have appeared throughout the series since, with the exception of Terminal.
 Carter Wilson / Terminal (voiced by Michael Rosenbaum) - A popular and genius student at Hamilton Hill High School who was obsessed with being the best at everything he did. He led the second group of Jokerz in an attempt to kill Maxine Gibson, who had scored higher on an important test than he had, and was going to be voted Class Valedictorian instead of him. Terminal's vendetta against Max and the subsequent intervention by Batman led to Max's realization of Terry's secret identity. Terminal later appears in the rebooted universe trying to revive a dying Bruce Wayne to gain access to his Keytone data network. He disguises Bruce as the Joker to gain influence and control over the Jokerz. Terminal is later killed by the real Joker, who had been aiding him in his scheme.
 Trey (voiced by Omar Gooding) - Terminal's "right-hand clown". He dropped out of school in the 6th grade to join the Jokerz. He used to be a member of J-Man's gang, but eventually joined up with Terminal's gang afterwards.
 Tayko (voiced by Cree Summer) - A member of Terminal's branch of the Jokerz who is an amazing gymnast.
 Weasel (voiced by Will Friedle) - A member of Terminal's branch. Known for his high-pitched holler, Weasel carries a flail around and has many other weapons in his jacket. He used to be a member of J-Man's branch of the Jokerz, but joined Terminal's branch later on.
 The Third Jokerz Faction - The third faction of the Jokerz was introduced in Batman Beyond: Return of the Joker where they worked for what appeared to be the Joker himself. They later reappeared in an episode of Justice League Unlimited, now working for Chronos and enhanced with superpowers. When Chronos was defeated, this timeline was erased.
 Bonk (voiced by Henry Rollins in Batman Beyond: Return of the Joker, Adam Baldwin in Justice League Unlimited) - A powerful, but surly enforcer/muscleman in the Jokerz' ranks. Though amazingly strong, Bonk is not a thug who takes orders willingly (especially if it has to do with swiping what he calls "a lot of geek junk" instead of cash). He has a hair-trigger temper and is liable to start up with anyone who gets in his way, be it Batman or Bonk's own Jokerz allies. This is his undoing when he argues with the Joker, accusing him of being a fake. In return, the Joker murders him either with a venomous spear gun disguised as a BANG! flag gun, or with laughing gas (depending on the unedited or edited version of the film). He appears in the Justice League Unlimited episode "The Once and Future Thing" equipped with a massive hammer that comes out of his arm.
 Chucko (voiced by Don Harvey) - Obese with tight-fitting pink clothes and a clown mask, he is a nasty bullying type who truly enjoys inflicting misery on others. A head enforcer for the Jokerz, he is a lot stronger and faster than his flabby gut would lead one to believe. True to his sadistic nature, Chucko's face is always hidden behind his mocking clown mask (aside from the heist at Wayne Enterprises, where he was wearing a gas mask). He uses a bazooka as a weapon. An alternate-timeline version of Chucko appears in the Justice League Unlimited episode "The Once and Future Thing". He appears here with a hovering ball instead of his normal legs and carries a lightsaber-like object. He betrays Chronos by tipping off the Justice League Unlimited and is sent back to the Mesozoic during the extinction of the dinosaurs. This incident serves as a warning to the other members of the Jokerz.
 Dee Dee (both voiced by Melissa Joan Hart) - The identical twin granddaughters of Harley Quinn and an unnamed individual. Delia and Deidre Dennis (often referred to by the collective name "Dee Dee" or simply, "the Deeds") are cute, charming, funny, and completely rotten to the core. They love the thrill of being part of the Jokerz and think it is a large charge to be working for the big man himself, the Joker. They use an acrobatics-based fighting style very similar to Harley's. They fight in unison, acting almost like one person controlling two bodies, even finishing each other's sentences. They are imprisoned at the end of Batman Beyond: Return of the Joker, but bailed out by their grandmother, the former Harley Quinn, whom they refer to as "Nana Harley". They appear in the Justice League Unlimited episode "The Once and Future Thing" with the power to multiply themselves upon impact. They also carry an energy whip, which electrocutes the victim on contact. This whip is what led to Terry and Kai-Ro's alternate deaths until this timeline was erased.
 Ghoul (voiced by Michael Rosenbaum impersonating Christopher Walken) - He wears ragged clothing and has grey skin, numerous stitching/scar marks and skull-like features; possibly he genetically altered his appearance to make himself look undead. His appearance vaguely mimics that of previous Batman nemesis the Scarecrow. A jaded young runaway from a wealthy home, Ghoul joined up with the Jokerz for kicks. He is heavily into techno-Goth music and has adapted the horror look into his costume. Ghoul is never without his plastic Halloween pumpkin, which he keeps filled with a number of monster-inspired weapons and tricks. Ghoul eventually returned in the Justice League Unlimited episode "The Once and Future Thing". He is now armed with a spinning blade in his right arm, which he can deploy or retract at will.
 Woof (vocal effects provided by Frank Welker in Batman Beyond: Return of the Joker, Dee Bradley Baker in Justice League Unlimited) - A Jokerz thug spliced with a spotted hyena. Though he sometimes appears to be nothing more than the Jokerz' comical mascot, Woof's crushing jaws and razor-like claws make him a deadly adversary. He also appears in the Justice League Unlimited episode "The Once and Future Thing", being armed with cybernetic arms able to gouge materials as hard as concrete and steel.

  (voiced by Shannon Kenny) - A freelance criminal who gained shapeshifting abilities from a mutagenic treatment, being able to become black, ink-like liquid. She is shown to be vulnerable to immersion in water (which can disperse her substance and hampers her ability to re-form) and freezing temperatures, the latter of which is how she is kept imprisoned after being apprehended. In the Justice League Unlimited episode "Epilogue", Inque appeared as a member of the Iniquity Collective where they fought the Justice League Unlimited. She is based on Clayface. She has a daughter named Deanna Clay (voiced by Azura Skye) from whom she is estranged.

  (voiced by Scott McAfee) - A nerd at Hamilton Hill High School who was constantly picked on by bullies at school, has unrequited feelings for Bobbi, and forced to deal with his overbearing father at home. Seeking revenge, he stole a mentally-controlled robot called the GoLeM (Galvanized Lifting Machine) from his father's construction company and used it to attack his tormentors, but the machine was destroyed by Batman and he was sent to juvenile detention for three years. However, his experience with the GoLeM caused him to develop powerful psychokinetic abilities, which he uses to bring terror to his fellow detainees and secretly leave and return to the facility at will. He attempted revenge on his schoolmates again by using his powers to convince everyone that the school was haunted. Despite having been defeated by Batman once more, Willie's powers remain active. He is also somewhat friendly to Terry McGinnis since he was not one of his tormentors; not knowing that Terry and his enemy, Batman, are one and the same.

 Victor Fries / Mr. Freeze (voiced by Michael Ansara) - The tragic villain lives on as nothing but an immortal head preserved by Derek Powers. He was used as a test subject in an attempt to clone a new body for Powers. Mr. Freeze's baseline DNA was used to create a new body where his mind was transferred into it. In his new body, Victor Fries started to make a lot of amends. However, Freeze's new body begins to suffer the same symptoms as his previous body like wanting to exist in cold temperatures. After Powers' scientist Dr. Stephanie Lake tries to eliminate Freeze to study the problem, he obtains a new advanced suit that was kept in "cold storage" and planned revenge where he froze Dr. Lake to death, leading to a final battle with Derek Powers' alter ego Blight and Batman as well. Driven past the breaking point by losing his life a second time while having been badly injured by Blight, Freeze finally committed suicide by overloading a reactor and sealing off the building, despite Batman trying to help him and having blasted Blight out of the compound. Mr. Freeze died in the ensuing explosion.

  - A group of scientists tragically transformed into superpowered beings during an apparent lab accident. At first, they tried to use their powers for the benefit of society, but their conditions slowly drove them into insanity. When they discovered that their mutations were irreversible and the accident had been set up by one of their co-workers Dr. Hodges, they set out to get revenge and to recreate their circumstances  to produce more of their kind. In the attempt, they were defeated by Batman, who trapped the 2-D Man and Freon in a ventilation system and used a water hose on Magma. The Terrific Trio are based on the criminal gang the Terrible Trio and the Marvel Comics superhero team the Fantastic Four.
 Dr. Mike Morgan / Magma (voiced by Robert Davi) - A hulking magma-like monster.
 Mary Michaels / Freon (voiced by Laura San Giacomo) - A gaseous woman with ice-like powers. In the rebooted universe, Doctor Hodges resurrects Freon at the cost of his life. Freon attempts to get revenge on Neo-Gotham by turning the city's defense system against itself, but she is stopped by Batman, Shriek, and Hacker.
 Stewart Lowe / the 2-D Man (voiced by Jeff Bennett) - A flat individual with stretching capabilities.

 Walter Shreeve /  (voiced by Chris Mulkey) - Walter Shreeve is initially a sound engineer hoping to improve society with his inventions. He is led down a decidedly darker path by Derek Powers, who wants a return on his investment in Shreeve's research. Powers thus dubs him "Shriek" based on his special suit, which allows him to generate destructive sound waves and manipulate sound in a wide variety of ways. During a fight with Batman, his suit is damaged, causing it to pick up sounds at such a high volume that Shreeve is rendered permanently deaf. Though he develops a special headset to hear normally, the incident drives him insane and vengeful against Batman, returning several times using his technology to seek revenge against him. Shriek later makes a cameo appearance in the Justice League Unlimited episode "Epilogue" as a member of the Iniquity Collective, where they were defeated by the Justice League Unlimited. In the rebooted universe, Shriek escapes from prison after Brother Eye's conquest of the world and becomes the self-appointed protector of the people who still live in the tunnels.
 Ollie (voiced by Michael Rosenbaum) - A splicer of indeterminate species who serves as Shriek's henchman and main ally in his crusade against Batman. Ollie is addicted to “the Fork”, a tuning fork-like device invented by Shriek that stimulates the pleasure centers of the brain.

 Charlie "" Bigelow (voiced by Stephen Baldwin in the first appearance, Clancy Brown in the second appearance) - A loudmouth hoodlum and a former friend of Terry McGinnis. Three years prior to Terry becoming Batman, Charlie and Terry were arrested for burglary. Charlie was old enough to be tried as an adult and was sentenced to three years in prison. Terry avoided prison because he was underage at the time and Terry's early life of petty crime was largely the result of Charlie's negative influence. Charlie attempts to reconnect with Terry after he is released, but is rebuffed due to his continuing criminal behavior. Charlie later becomes involved with a gang of thieves-for-hire who plan to rob a Wayne-Powers research lab to steal an experimental chemical for a rival company. During the robbery, Terry (as Batman) intervenes. Charlie is exposed to the chemical during the fight and later mutates into a deformed towering super-strong being. This event leaves Terry wracked with guilt. Big Time later returns in “Betrayal”, trying to take over the Neo-Gotham underworld and kidnapping Terry so he could join him. Big Time apparently falls to his death into the harbor during a fight with Batman at the end of the episode.

 Richard "Richie" Armacost (voiced by Robert Patrick) - A top executive at the agricultural company Agri-Chem who was jailed for insider trading. He met and befriended Big Time while in prison and talked him into a job.
 Karros (voiced by William H. Macy) - A mercenary and high-tech specialist employed by Agri-Chem.

 The Royal Flush Gang - A future incarnation of the group. They are all Spades. This version of the Royal Flush Gang consists of a crime family of five members:
 Mr. Walker as King (voiced by George Lazenby) - 
 Mrs. Walker as Queen (voiced by Amanda Donohoe in the first appearance, Sarah Douglas in later appearances) -
 Melanie Walker as Ten (voiced by Olivia d'Abo) - See above.
 Jack Walker as Jack (voiced by Scott Cleverdon in the first appearance, Nicholas Guest in later appearances) - Son of Mr. and Mrs. Walker.
 Ace - An android who serves as their bodyguard.

 Bane: In the years since Bruce Wayne's retirement from crimefighting, Bane's constant use of the super-steroid Venom has destroyed his body, leaving him a withered husk of a man kept alive by the very drug that once gave him superhuman strength.
  (voiced by Larry Drake) - Bane's personal attendant. When someone begins selling Venom-laced patches called "slappers" to teenagers, it is discovered that Chappell has the formula and is mass-producing it. During a battle with Batman, Chappell overdoses on the slappers, which puts him into a coma.

 Ira Billings / The Spellbinder (voiced by Jon Cypher) - Ira Billings is a bitter and underpaid psychologist at Terry's high school who commits crimes using sophisticated virtual reality systems and his knowledge of the human mind. After his first arrest, his life is ruined as the result of his exposure as a supervillain and he blames Batman for it, then seeks revenge. In the rebooted universe, the Spellbinder brainwashes Terry after the latter's supposed death into becoming the new Rewire, while Tim Drake becomes the new Batman Beyond. He is eventually defeated by Drake.

 The Society of Assassins - A secret group of assassins.
 The Master Assassin (voiced by Victor Rivers) - A man named Devon is the head of the Society of Assassins.
  (voice effects provided by Melissa Disney) - A member of the Society of Assassins, who wields a laser-sharpened scimitar that can cut through any material and never speaks. Her true identity was never revealed and Batman had once glimpsed her feature when her veil fell during a fight. He was visibly shocked and this implied that she is terribly disfigured. After Batman foils her attempt to assassinate Gotham's District Attorney, she ends up becoming a target of the Society herself, resulting in Curaré ultimately killing every member of the Society of Assassins before seeking revenge against Batman. In the rebooted universe, Curaré arrives in Gotham to warn Batman about the League of Assassins' plans under the leadership of the new Ra's al Ghul. Unlike the animated series, she does engage in conversation with her allies and opponents.
 Mutro Botha (voiced by Tim Curry) - The last surviving member of the Society of Assassins, who tries to blackmail Batman into protecting him from Curaré.

  (voiced by Ian Buchanan) - A doctor who starts a trend in infusing animal biology with human DNA known as "Splicing". Using his research to commit crimes before ending up on the wanted list, Cuvier later used a vampire bat serum on Batman and later goes into hiding with his minions following a botched attack on Sam Young. When Batman tracked them to the abandoned Carmine's Taxidermy Studio, Cuvier later mutates himself into a genetic chimera with hawk, snake, and tiger traits to battle Batman following his minions' defeat. He ends up getting a massive overdose that further mutates him into a monster and apparently dies when he accidentally ignites several gas tanks, causing a massive explosion. Though the technology of splicing becomes outlawed shortly after Cuvier's presumed death, it continues to surface as an illegal subculture throughout the series. In the two-part episode "Curse of the Kobra", it is hinted that he is a member of Kobra, as a younger version of him was seen with Zander and Dr. Childes. Cuvier appeared in the comic book spin-off, having survived the incident, and appeared in issue #3 of the second volume, where he reverted to his original hybrid form with a plan to splice animals with human DNA. In the rebooted universe, he is one of Brother Eye's allies and battles Tim Drake.
 Ramrod (voiced by Ice-T) - A delinquent spliced with ram DNA and one of Cuvier's henchmen, who is the strongest of the group.
 King Cobra (voiced by Timothy Dang) - A delinquent spliced with snake DNA and one of Cuvier's henchmen, who is the more agile of the group.
 Tigress (voiced by Cree Summer) - A woman spliced with tiger DNA, Cuvier's assistant at the Chimera Institute and one of his henchmen.

 The T's - A rival gang of the Jokerz.
 Fat T (voiced by Kevin Michael Richardson) - The leader of the T's.

 Tony Maychek /  (voiced by Stephen Collins) - After being accidentally buried by radioactive waste, Tony Maychek becomes an insane skeletal creature sealed inside and capable of manipulating the Earth. He seeks revenge on his former business partner who abandoned him and raised his daughter as his own. The Earthmover later commits suicide by bringing down the cavern he resides in on top of himself.

 Robert Vance (voiced by Stacy Keach) - After uploading his mind into his company's computer systems before his death, Robert Vance plans to resurrect himself by downloading his virtual consciousness into the body of one of his descendants. His consciousness is deleted and his mind regresses into nothing in a manner similar to HAL 9000 from the film 2001: A Space Odyssey.

  (voiced by Carl Lumbly) - An African hunter wanted on three continents who was enhanced with cybernetic implants after an encounter with an injured black panther that broke his spine in five places. These implants enhanced the Stalker's strength, speed, and reflexes. The Stalker used this abilities to take revenge on the black panther. Being superstitious and needing a worthy prey to hunt, he believes that Batman is an ageless warrior spirit of a bat. Finding wild animals too easy to hunt with his new body, he seeks Batman as the ultimate prey and proves to be one of his more difficult opponents. While the Stalker was thought dead upon being struck by a train after Batman electrocuted his cybernetics, he would later turn up alive when the NSA found him. The Stalker was later used by Agent Bennett to work with Batman in hunting Falseface. In the Justice League Unlimited episode "Epilogue", the Stalker appears as a member of the Iniquity Collective where they fought the Justice League Unlimited. In the rebooted universe, the Stalker was hired by Payback to capture Batman. He only agreed to do so because his village was on the brink of extinction thanks to Brother Eye's attacks. After aiding Batman in his fight against Payback, Terry brings Wayne Enterprises resources to the Stalker's village to save his people.

  (voiced by Henry Rollins) - A rabidly anti-government terrorist who rebels against what he sees as a corrupt system. His solution to any given problem is to "blow it up", and as such he is an expert in explosives.

 Ratboy (voiced by Taran Noah Smith) - Patrick Fitz is a teenage runaway with rat-like features and the ability to telepathically control rats (similar to the DC Universe villain the Ratcatcher). It is noted that many people had a tendency to call him Ratboy because of his strange appearance. He develops an obsession with Dana, frequently sending her love letters and gifts. He later kidnaps Dana, taking her to his home in the sewers and confessing his love for her, but she rebuffs him and he angrily commands an army of rats to kill her. After Batman saves her, he is caught in an explosion and presumed dead.

 The  - A group of villainous psychics who forcibly recruit children with mental talents.
 Bombshell (voiced by Kate Jackson) - A member of the infamous Brain Trust, Bombshell possesses the ability to fire projectiles from her hand. It is also hinted that she has the ability to manipulate minds, although this is never fully revealed in the series. She is later apprehended by Batman and sent to jail.
 The Invulnerable Man (voiced by Victor Rivers) - An accomplice of Bombshell's. He has an ability connected to the idea of mind over matter, rendering himself invulnerable (hence his name). He is dispatched by Batman, who renders him psychically blind and deaf.
 Edgar Mandragora (voiced by Brian Tochi in the first appearance, John Rhys-Davies in later appearances) - A member of the Brain Trust with telepathic and telekinetic abilities. He is apprehended by Batman and sent to jail. Justice League Unlimited reveals that his father is the crime lord Steven Mandragora (a stand-in for the crime lord Tobias Whale) and the man who murdered the parents of the Huntress when she was young and vowed vengeance with help from the Question.

  (voiced by John Ritter) - The head of a "resort" for troubled kids called "the Ranch". Instead of helping troubled teenagers, however, he breaks their will by putting them in the ISO (an isolation room) and collects huge sums of money from their guardians. When Terry's friend, Chelsea Cunningham, is sent there for no real reason, Terry decides to investigate "the Ranch" undercover.

 James "Jim" Tate /  (voiced by Dorian Harewood) - James "Jim" Tate is a brilliant weapons designer working for a large defense contractor, who is also the stepfather of one of Terry's friends, Jared. After he loses his job when his light weapons manufacturing division was disowned by Paxton Powers to merge it with another division and he could not be given a job at ForceTech by Istivan Hegedesh, Jim builds himself an arsenal of advanced weapons and body armor and becomes the supervillain Armory to steal his prototype device from Wayne-Powers and some items from Gotham Industrial Electronics to make ends meet for his family, but is later thwarted by Batman. Armory later realizes the error of his ways and assists Batman in defeating Hegedesh before he is apparently sent to jail, although it is implied that his heroic actions will lead to a reduced prison sentence, with Jared telling Terry and Max that his family will also have to pay a stiff fine.

 Istivan Hegedesh (voiced by Corey Burton) - A weapons designer at ForceTech and old friend of Jim Tate. ForceTech would later be revealed to be behind some sales to a shady country that is under a weapons embargo. When Hegedesh and the rest of Jim's family find out about Jim's workshop, Hegedesh ran afoul of Batman and used a sonic weapon to subdue him before being foiled by Jim. This enabled Batman to defeat Hegedesh. Hegedesh was arrested afterwards.

  (voiced by Michael McKean) - The host of "The Inside Peek", a popular tabloid newscast, Ian Peek uses an experimental vibra-space belt that allows him to phase through solid objects, enabling him to uncover any celebrity's secrets and use them to boost ratings on his show. Ian exposed boxing trainer Jack Turley's affair with the champion's girlfriend, Jamie Jerald splicing herself with snake DNA to give herself a forked tongue, and Paxton Powers neglecting work. He nearly reveals both Terry and Bruce's secret identities, but ultimately loses control of his intangibility powers, becoming permanently intangible and falling into the center of the Earth.

 Ma Mayhem (voiced by Kathleen Freeman) - The leader of a dysfunctional family of thieves.
 Carl and Slim (voiced by Mark Rolston and Andy Dick respectively) - The sons of Ma Mayhem.

 Kobra - A terrorist organization bent on world domination. Its members include:
 Zander (voiced by Alexis Denisof) - The heir of the organization's leadership. Created by Kobra scientists to be the perfect leader, Zander was given everything they thought he needed as a leader. He quickly becomes attracted to Max, deciding to make her his queen. However, his plans were foiled by Batman and he perishes when his air base crashes to the ground.
 Dr. Childes (voiced by Xander Berkeley) - A high-ranking Kobra member who was in charge of Zander's upbringing.
  (voiced by Townsend Coleman) - A thief-for-hire able to temporarily alter his appearance to resemble anyone he wants to, with his normal appearance being disfigured and easily recognizable.
 Other faction leaders: There are different unnamed faction leaders of Kobra who are voiced by Keith Szarabajka (in the episode "Unmasked") and Lance Henriksen (in the Static Shock episode "Future Shock").
 Kobra Agents (voiced by Corey Burton, Kerrigan Mahan, Gary Anthony Sturgis, and Keith Szarabajka) - The foot soldiers of Kobra.
 Kobra Dinosaur Mutants - Zander led his Kobra faction in a plot that involved splicing some Kobra agents with the DNA of dinosaurs that were stolen from Dr. Padu Banjahri. This transformed them into humanoid dinosaurs.

 The April Moon Gang - A gang of delinquents that wear retractable armor. They kidnapped Dr. Peter Corso's wife April Moon to give them cybernetic enhancements. It was discovered that April was in on it all along. Batman later discovered that saying her name deactivated the cybernetics.
 April "Moon" Corso (voiced by Daphne Zuniga) - A nurse and wife of Dr. Peter Corso whose marriage included the song "April Moon" playing in the background. While it assumed that Harold and his friends kidnapped April for Dr. Corso to give them cybernetic enhancements, Batman later discovered that she was in on Harold's plot, as Harold had an affair with her. After the April Moon Gang was defeated, April's fate is unknown.
 Bullwhip (voiced by Jason Nash) - The leader of the April Moon Gang. Harold is a man who learned about Dr. Peter Corso's work with cybernetics while undergoing wrist replacement surgery. He blackmailed Corso into giving him and his friends cybernetic enhancements by kidnapping his wife April Moon. Bullwhip received retractable metal whips in his wrists. After Corso discovers Bullwhip had an affair with April, Bullwhip comes back for an upgrade following the defeat of his teammates while stating that he will get April back, unaware of Corso's discovery. As Bullwhip asks Corso not to hold back while working on him, Corso applies anesthesia to Bullwhip. Before losing consciousness, Bullwhip sees Corso with a drill as he quotes "I understand. No holding back..." as the episode ends. It is implied that Corso got his revenge on Bullwhip.
 Terrapin (voiced by Ethan Embry) - A heavyset and muscular teenager and a member of the April Moon Gang. His enhancements enabled him to cover his body in a full suit of metal armor resembling a robot, though it restricted his mobility, agility, and sight.
 Knux (voiced by Johnny Galecki) - A new member of the April Moon Gang. His enhancements enabled him to don hammers that could extend from his forearms.
 Kneejerk (voiced by Eric Michael Cole) - A member of the April Moon Gang. His enhancements gave him synthetic arms and legs that could produce chainsaws from his wrists and knees.

  (voiced by Tristan Rogers) - The producer of the role-playing video game The Sentries of the Last Cosmos. Harper sends his Sentries to destroy any records of the true creator of the game, Eldon Michaels, who is suing him.

 Kenny Stanton /  (voiced by Adam Wylie as Kenny, Bill Fagerbakke as Payback) - A troubled-yet-gifted child who was neglected by his father Dr. Stanton due to his work as a psychiatrist. Kenny believes that the only way his father would be able to spend time with him is to solve his patients' problems for him by taking revenge on his father's patients' tormentors. The boy is able to build his own powered exoskeleton armed with an advanced laser cutter and takes the costumed persona of "Payback". Believing himself to be a superhero standing up for children, Kenny tries to imitate his idol Batman. After being defeated by Batman, Kenny is arrested as Batman advised Dr. Stanton to go to him. In the rebooted universe, Kenny was sent to juvenile detention after being defeated by Batman. He eventually committed suicide in the facility after being constantly bullied by the older inmates and receiving no visits from his father who disowned him. Blaming Neo-Gotham City and Batman for his son's death, Dr. Stanton succeeds him as the new Payback until he is defeated by Batman and Ten.

  (voiced by Bill Smitrovich) - The head of a ring of brutal underground dog fights. He experimented with an experimental growth hormone called Cerestone (the same one that created Big Time) to breed large dogs. With help from Ace, Terry defeated Ronny.
 The Cerestone Dog Prototype - The first dog that Ronny experimented on. It grew to the size of an elephant and had a horrific appearance. It was electrocuted by Terry.

 The  (voiced by Gedde Watanabe) - A supervillain who acquired an experimental suit that could repel matter, making him invulnerable to almost any type of damage. Eventually, it was revealed that the villain is actually Doctor Suzuki, a man who was developing the technology for Wayne-Powers.

 Ra's al Ghul (voiced by David Warner) - Living on by using a computer process to transfer his mind into the body of his own daughter Talia al Ghul after his own body finally became too degenerated from repeated use of the rejuvenating Lazarus Pits, the seemingly immortal villain Ra's al Ghul intends to take over Bruce Wayne's body and gain control of Wayne Enterprises. He is eventually killed in an explosion from the Lazarus Pit, presumably permanently. In the rebooted universe, Ra's al Ghul takes his grandson and Bruce's son Damian Wayne back under his wing before Brother Eye conquers the planet and raises him with his teachings. After Ra's al Ghul passes away due to using the Lazarus Pit too many times, Damian succeeds his grandfather as the new Ra's al Ghul.
 Talia al Ghul (voiced by Olivia Hussey) - The daughter of Ra's al Ghul.

  (voiced by Reiner Schöne) - A poacher who masquerades as an animal activist. One of the animals he had killed was the mother of an anthropomorphic intelligent gorilla named Fingers.

 The Major (voiced by Jon Polito) - A Gotham crime lord who took in Big Time and used him as his muscle.

Others
 The National Security Agency (NSA) - A counter-terrorism organization.
 Agent James Bennet (voiced by Joe Spano in the first appearance, Kurtwood Smith in later appearances) - A counter-terrorism officer from the NSA, who is at odds with Batman on how to handle situations whenever he sets foot in Neo-Gotham; especially regarding the fugitive robot Zeta, whom his team is constantly pursuing. He is the main antagonist of the spin-off series The Zeta Project.
 Agent West (voiced by Michael Rosenbaum) - A bumbling NSA agent who follows Agent Bennett on their mission to hunt down Zeta. He also appeared in The Zeta Project.

 Jackie Maychek Wallace (voiced by Lindsay Sloane) - A friend of Terry McGinnis and Dana Tan from Hamilton High, a daughter of Tony Maychek and an adoptive child of Bill Wallace.

 Bill Wallace (voiced by Dan Lauria) - Former business partner of Tony Maychek and adoptive father of Jackie Maychek.

 Bobby Vance (voiced by Rider Strong) - A grandson of Robert Vance.

 The Sentries of the Last Cosmos - They are ardent players of an in-depth virtual reality role-playing game.
 Corey Cavalieri (voiced by Chris Demetral) - 
 Dempsey (voiced by Seth Green) - 
 Burfi (voiced by Alex Thomas, Jr.) - 

 Tamara Caulder (voiced by Mara Wilson) - A young girl targeted by the Brain Trust because of her powerful telepathic abilities.

 Darius Arthur Kelman a.k.a. "Dak" (voiced by Eli Marienthal) - A young runaway who idolizes Batman's rogues gallery until the day he helped Batman defeat Shriek.

 Miguel Diaz (voiced by Sean Marquette) - A child once targeted by Kobra because of his awareness of Batman's secret identity.

 Dr. Peter Corso (voiced by Ed Begley Jr.) - A bionics specialist who designed the technology which would become Terry's Batsuit. He would be coerced into enhancing Harold in his friends when they kidnap his wife April. Batman would later reveal that April was in on Harold's plot and revealed her affair with Harold. This would lead to Dr. Corso exacting his own revenge on Harold during his next upgrade by using anesthesia on him as he last sees Dr. Corso with a drill in his hand stating "I understand. No holding back..."

 Mr. Tan (voiced by Clyde Kusatsu) - Dana Tan's father. He disapproves of his daughter's relationship with Terry McGinnis because of Terry's past as a juvenile delinquent.

  (voiced by Takayo Fischer) - Terry McGinnis and Zander's martial arts instructor. Kairi was trained by the same sensei who had trained Bruce Wayne, Yoru, and Bruce had once rescued her as Batman from Yoru's rogue student Kyodai Ken (see Batman: The Animated Series episode "Day of the Samurai"). At some point after she met Bruce and his alter-ego, she found out that they were the same man and became one of his close friends. She was originally voiced by Julia Kato in Batman: The Animated Series.

 Bunny Vreeland (voiced by Lynne Moody) - The daughter of one of Bruce Wayne's closest friends, Veronica Vreeland, and the last person the original Batman saved prior to his retirement.

 Dr. Gray Stanton (voiced by Mitch Pileggi) - A counselor at the Gotham Youth Counseling Center. Due to him being busy, he neglected his son Kenny. When Kenny was exposed as Payback upon his defeat and arrested, Dr. Stanton blamed himself for neglecting him. Bruce Wayne tells him to go to his on. In the rebooted universe, Dr. Stanton's first name was revealed to be Gray and disowned his son after he was arrested for his actions as Payback. Because of Dr. Stanton not visiting him and being bullied in juvenile hall, Kenny committed suicide. Blaming Neo-Gotham City and Batman for his son's death which consumed him, Dr. Stanton becomes the second Payback and began his revenge on them until he is defeated by Batman and Ten.

 Fingers (voiced by Malachi Throne) - A vengeful anthropomorphic gorilla, who was captured by poacher James van Dyle and spliced with human DNA, giving him humanlike intelligence. After van Dyle's arrest and his subsequent return to Africa, Fingers vows to use both his natural abilities and new intellect to protect his home from human aggressors.

 Dr. Price (voiced by Wendie Malick) - A scientist working for the U.S. Army to develop state-of-the-art combat vehicles. A group of Jokerz steals one of the experimental crafts and thus Price teams up with Batman. Though she is injured during the conflict, she provides a key card for the craft's reactor to Batman and urges him to stop the Jokerz. He ultimately succeeds.

Appearing in Batman Beyond: Return of the Joker

 Tim Drake (voiced by Dean Stockwell as an old man, Mathew Valencia as a younger Tim, Andrea Romano as Joker Jr.) - The former Robin and one of Bruce's protégés and partners. Tim's kidnapping and torture by the Joker and Harley Quinn years ago as the Boy Wonder has left him traumatized and retired from crimefighting, leaving him struggling to keep his sanity intact from his ordeal. He now works as a communications engineer and has settled down with a wife and family. In the rebooted universe, a time-displaced Tim Drake from the Futures End timeline briefly succeeds Terry as the new Batman Beyond.

 Joker (voiced by Mark Hamill) - The evil and sly Clown Prince of Crime. He was killed by Tim Drake long ago, but revived through nanotechnology, taking control of Tim's body. Terry manages to freed Tim by destroying the microchip that Joker implanted in Tim's mind. In the rebooted universe, Joker survived his supposed final encounter with the original Batman and killed several members of the Jokerz for stealing his image. He recruits a couple of them and rebrands them as "the Throwbacks" to take on the new Batman and Robin. Joker captures Robin and uses him to discover Bruce was the original Batman. He battles Bruce one last time in the Batcave before dying of a heart attack, but his corpse at the morgue was stolen by an elderly Harley Quinn.

 Harley Quinn (voiced by Arleen Sorkin) - The henchgirl/lover of the Joker. Because of the Joker's death in the last confrontation with the original Batman and Batgirl, Harley went into hiding and redeemed herself which left her enemies to assume that she had died after falling in a pit. She later reappears as an elderly woman, revealed to be the grandmother of Delia and Deidre Dennis (Dee Dee). Harley scolds Dee Delia and Deidre when they are released into her custody while awaiting trial.

 Jordan Pryce (voiced by Mark Hamill) - An executive at the newly-rebuilt Wayne Enterprises following the presumed death of Derek Powers and the arrest of Paxton Powers, he harbors hatred towards Bruce Wayne because his return ruins Pryce's chance of taking over Wayne-Powers as its CEO. After saving him from Joker, Batman exposes his illegal activities and Jordan is arrested by the police.

Appearing in Epilogue
The following characters appeared in the Justice League Unlimited episode "Epilogue", which takes place in this timeline:

 Amanda Waller (voiced by CCH Pounder) - The head of Project Cadmus. Having developed a respect for the original Batman years ago, Waller started "Project Batman Beyond" to ensure that the world would always have a protector like Bruce Wayne which resulted in Terry's birth. Terry later visited an elderly Amanda Waller who told him everything about the Justice League's history and "Project Batman Beyond".

 The Phantasm - Bruce Wayne's former fiancée. Amanda Waller tried to get her to pull a Joe Chill on Warren and Mary McGinnis only to have second thoughts which she later argued with Waller on. Having heard this information during his visit to Waller, Terry mentioned to her that his dad was killed anyway. Andrea Beaumont came back to Gotham to pursue Jake Chill because of his involvement with Warren McGinnis' murder and keeping a secret with Project Cadmus involving Bruce and Terry McGinnis.

 Parasite (voiced by Marc Worden) - A future successor of the infamous Superman villain who is a member of the Iniquity Collective. He alongside Inque, Shriek, and Stalker fought Batman and the Justice League Unlimited before being defeated by them.

Appearing in the comic book adaptations

The following characters appear in the comic book adaptations:

Supporting characters in the comic book adaptions
 Dick Grayson - After a battle with the Joker years ago, the first Robin retired his role as Nightwing and is now a man who feels bitter towards Bruce Wayne, mainly because of his former mentor's inadvertent role in causing the disintegration of his relationship with Barbara Gordon. His past as Nightwing is publicly exposed without jeopardizing his allies' secrets and he acts as a mentor to Bruce's successor Terry McGinnis after Bruce reclaims Wayne Enterprises. In the rebooted universe that takes place after The New 52: Futures End, Dick is now the Mayor of Blüdhaven and has both eyes intact. He also has a daughter named Elainna.

 Catwoman - The daughter of the villain Multiplex, she is a metahuman thief who emulates Selina Kyle's feline motif and a lover of Dick Grayson.

 Wonder Woman - A former love interest of the original Batman, widow of the original Justice Lords' Batman, and second wife-in-name of Lord Superman (succeeding Lady Wonder Woman).

 Batwoman - An unknown woman who steals the Batsuit from the Batcave after Terry suffers from amnesia due to Falseface's attack. She is later revealed to be Elainna Grayson, the daughter of Dick Grayson.

Villains in the comic book adaptions
 Hush - A psychopathic clone of Dick Grayson and successor of one of the original Batman's deadliest foes, Dr. Thomas Elliot.

 Mad Hatter - One of the original Batman's rogues gallery, Jervis Tetch's last battle with the Dark Knight has apparently left him in a catatonic state and serving his psychiatric sentence.

 Signalman - Phillip "Phil" Cobb was a minor costumed criminal known as the Signalman who previously battled the original Batman. He was murdered by the new Hush.

 Calendar Man - One of the few members of the original rogues gallery who are still active, Julian Gregory Day attempted to kill Commissioner Barbara Gordon by sending her an exploding greeting card, but was murdered by the new Hush before he was able to do so.

 Dr. Thawne - An ancestor of Eobard Thawne (a.k.a. Professor Zoom the Reverse-Flash) who is responsible for Inque's transformation at Project Cadmus.

 Tweedledums and Tweedledees - A new street gang. Like the Jokerz, they emulate a pair of the original Dark Knight's foes, Tweedledum and Tweedledee.

 Matter Master - Carson Jatts, a metahuman control officer, discovers that the many metahuman energies he has been exposed over the years has started to kill him. Wanting revenge against the superhero community, Jatts tries to steal Mark Mandrill's metachem wand, but accidentally absorbs its energies into his hand, giving him the power to change elements by touch and becomes the new Matter Master.

 Joker King - Dana Tan's troubled brother who worships the late Clown Prince of Crime and desires to follow in his footsteps. Doug Tan becomes a leader of the Jokerz, calling himself the Joker King and leading the Jokerz to cause chaos in Neo-Gotham City. The Joker King is also obsessed with triumphing over Batman, who had defeated his idol in the recent past and wants to rectify it by killing the victor. After the battle with Batman and his allies, the Joker King's reign of terror ends when his foot is caught by some rope and he falls off the ledge. The swing from the rope causes Doug's body to slam against the concrete wall of an unfinished building. The trauma inflicted to Doug's head kills him instantly. His liver is donated by his family to Bruce Wayne, who was dying at the time and in need of a transplant.

 Rebel One - The secret leader of hacker collective Undercloud. She grew up on Level 2 of Neo-Gotham and resented the people that lived in the higher levels. Her father died from poison inhalation, working long hours at a Carbon Conversion Plant. Her mother died of stress from working three jobs to support the family. She used Undercloud to secretly collect the pieces of the Metal Men and turn them into a metal giant to level Neo-Gotham. Her goal is to make everyone equal in poverty.

 Rewire - Possessing the power to control his body's bioelectrical impulses, Davis Dusk, son of Gotham Mayor William Dusk, was secretly treated for mental illness to avoid political controversy for the Mayor. He deceives his doctors into thinking his therapy worked while actually planning the murder of his father by disrupting his pacemaker through a telephone.  His powers are amplified by a mixture of Venom and Joker venom created by Ghoul. Davis is eventually brought down by a containment device that regulates the electrical impulses that his father had built before his death. In the rebooted universe, the Spellbinder brainwashes Terry into believing he is Davis Dusk and the new Rewire.

 Man-Bat - After the original Batman helped rescue his wife Francine from her own Man-Bat metamorphosis (see the Batman: The Animated Series episode "Terror in the Sky"), Kirk Langstrom had vowed to never again take the serum that had nearly destroyed his life.  After he swore off genetic research, and with funding from Wayne Enterprises, both he and Francine became pioneers in the field of sonics and acoustics. Kirk somehow also discovered that Bruce Wayne was Batman years ago when he funded Kirk's sonic research. Though both Kirk and Francine were happily married for years and eventually had a son and a daughter named Max and Michelle, Francine eventually begins to suffer from Parkinson's disease and Kirk's relationship with his children begins to deteriorate. After Francine's death and his children's subsequent discovery of his secret (which cause them to walk out on him), Kirk's sanity collapses; using an improved version of the Man-Bat serum, he assumes that identity again, this time with full control over the Man-Bat.

 Brother Eye - Brother Eye serves as the main antagonist of The New 52: Futures End and the beginning of the rebooted Batman Beyond universe. It is responsible for transforming most of Earth into a cybernetic apocalypse and the death of Terry McGinnis, leading Tim Drake to become the new Batman. When Tim discovers that time travel cannot defeat Brother Eye, he destroys it by attacking it on its moon base with the help of Inque.

 Scarecrow - Adayln Stern was the daughter of a notorious gang leader in Gotham. As a child, she is traumatized after witnessing the original Batman ruthlessly beat up her father in front of her. Her fear of Batman was amplified when she was placed in institutional care by one of Jonathan Crane's disciples. She grew up to become a co-anchor to Jack Ryder on News 52. Stern succeeds Crane as the new Scarecrow and attempts to use A.I. cubes that are present in everyone's homes to turn Neo-Gotham against Batman, but fails and is incarcerated in Arkham Asylum when she sees herself as no one but the Scarecrow.

Other characters in the comic book adaptions
 Dr. Nora Reid ( Elliot) - A granddaughter of the apparently-deceased Doctor Thomas Elliot, geneticist Doctor Nora Elliot-Reid seeks to amend her paternal grandfather's sins as the criminal mastermind Hush by working for Amanda Waller. Reid inadvertently created a successor who would carry on his legacy by cloning one of the original Batman's partners. It is believed that her grandfather died as Hush after his last battle with the original Dark Knight Detective. However, despite the official police report confirming the body's identity, Elliot's reputation as a master tactician and skilled surgeon had left his enemies in doubt of whether it really belonged to the villain.  Because of the Elliot family's history of depravity and deception, many also doubt whether Doctor Reid is really as decent as she seems to be.

 Undercloud - A collective of internet users who blackmail Max Gibson into joining. Undercloud is a loose collective of over 1,000 hackers, operating 'in the dark' so that no one member can endanger the entire collective. While the members think they are equal partners, the collective is secretly run by Rebel One. After Rebel One's defeat, Max Gibson takes over running of Undercloud for the benefits of Batman's missions.

 Lucius Fox Jr. - The son of Bruce Wayne's former business partner Lucius Fox and CEO of Foxteca. Lucius Jr. now serves as Wayne's business partner after he and Wayne merged their companies as Wayne Incorporated.

 Vigilante -  is a great-grandnephew of Joe Chill, the mugger who murdered Thomas and Martha Wayne. Chill is also a former security guard of Wayne-Powers who worked under Derek Powers' right-hand-man Mr. Fixx. His employment by Powers had led Chill down the same path as his great-granduncle's: by killing Warren McGinnis under Mr. Fixx's orders, leaving him wracked with guilt towards the McGinnises and repeating history again by indirectly creating a Batman. After Bruce Wayne reclaimed his family's company, he fired Chill after he had been discovered to have worked at Powers' "Quiet Squad", aware of Chill's relation to his parents' killer and his possible involvement in Warren McGinnis' murder. His termination also drove Chill towards poverty. Seeing Batman as an inspiration, Chill sets to become a vigilante himself to atone for his family's sins. He called himself Vigilante and worked with Batman to stop a Jokerz riot led by Doug Tan. He is eventually killed by the Jokerz and the Phantasm (who was sent to kill him by Waller to prevent Batman from doing so after Terry discovered his identity). His death led to Terry ending his partnership with Bruce, as Bruce did not inform Terry about Chill's past.

 The Hacker - In the rebooted universe, Bo Han was a young technological genius who gained the ability to hack nearly any technology with his hands during Brother Eye's invasion. He becomes a new vigilante known as the Hacker and protects the Chinatown district of Neo-Gotham.

Justice Lords
In the parallel universe where the Justice Lords reside, the original Lord Batman has long died after fighting Lord Superman, Lady Wonder Woman, and their tyrannical followers. In the future of that world, Bruce Wayne's absence affected those who were closest to him and, in addition, those who would have been if he was still alive:

 Terrance "T" McGinnis (Justice Lords) - Terrence "T" McGinnis is in a relationship with the former Royal Flush Gang member Ten (Melanie Walker), and without Bruce Wayne's guidance, he remains a delinquent and is a member of the Jokerz alongside his lover. After T. meets his heroic counterpart, he begins to question his purpose in life. After the Justice Lords' defeat, T. is inspired to become the new Batman, with Dick Grayson as his mentor.  Unlike his counterpart, T. is not driven by the tragic death of his father (whose murder never occurred in this world), but by Lord Superman's unjust actions upon the world.

 Mary McGinnis (Justice Lords) - Suffering former wife of Warren McGinnis and mother of T. McGinnis.

 Dick Grayson (Justice Lords) - Like his counterpart, Grayson also served as Lord Batman's partner as Robin and later Nightwing. However, due to the Joker being lobotomized by Lord Superman years before, Grayson never sustained an injury resulting in the loss of an eye, as did his counterpart. In turn, his successor Tim Drake never gave up being Robin and went on to become the Red Robin until Lord Batman's death forced both Grayson and Drake to retire from superheroics. In addition, Grayson married Barbara Gordon and worked as a high-ranking officer to the Justice Lords' task force. However, Dick did not allow Gotham to completely descend into a totalitarian state like the rest of the world. Terry McGinnis' arrival inspired Grayson to continue his late mentor's mission and to groom McGinnis' counterpart into the new Batman.

 Barbara Gordon (Justice Lords) - Wife of Dick Grayson. Like her husband, Barbara also previously served as Lord Batman's partner as Batgirl, but unlike her counterpart, Barbara was never romantically involved with Bruce Wayne (who was happily married to Wonder Woman prior to his death), and thus never indirectly caused the disintegration between Dick's bond with his mentor. She and Dick are happily married and they have a son.

 John Grayson II - Young son of Dick Grayson and Barbara Gordon. Learning of John's existence makes the mainstream universe's Dick Grayson envy the life his counterpart leads with his wife and he becomes more bitter towards Bruce, who indirectly caused the disintegration of his relationship with Barbara.

 Warren McGinnis (Justice Lords) - Suffering former husband of Mary McGinnis and father of T. McGinnis.

 Zod - Genetically engineered son of Lord Superman and Lady Wonder Woman who joins the Justice League as the youngest member and under the tutelage of his father's benevolent counterpart, Superman.

References

 
Batman Beyond
Batman Beyond
Batman Beyond